Lionel John "Leo" Reynolds ( c. 1888 – c. 1957) was a rugby union player who represented Australia.

Reynolds, a lock, was born in Cumnock, New South Wales and claimed a total of 2 international rugby caps for Australia.

References

                   

Australian rugby union players
Australia international rugby union players
Year of death missing
Year of birth uncertain
Rugby union locks
Rugby union players from New South Wales